Hodroyd Hall at South Hiendley in the parish of Felkirk near Barnsley in West Yorkshire, England is an Elizabethan manor house currently used as 3 dwellings. It is Grade II listed.

It is built with sandstone, has stone slate roofs, and originally had a rectangular floor plan. Additions have been made at the rear of the building.
The building is two-and-a-half storeys, and the principal facade faces west.

History
The Hoydroyd estate was acquired from Nostell Priory by the Gargrave family in the 16th century, and subsequently in the 17th century by Richard Berrie (by marriage), whose wife Prudence endowed the school at the Church of St Peter, Felkirk.

See also
Listed buildings in South Hiendley

References

Country houses in West Yorkshire
Grade II listed buildings in West Yorkshire